Ptilonia (Harvey) J. Agardh, 1863  is a genus of red algae in the family Bonnemaisoniaceae.

Espécies
There are six species:
Ptilonia australasica Harvey, 1859
Ptilonia magellanica (Montagne) J. Agardh
Ptilonia mooreana Levring, 1955
Ptilonia okadae Yamada, 1933
Ptilonia subulifera J. Agardh, 1890
Ptilonia willana Lindauer, 1947

References

Bonnemaisoniaceae
Red algae genera